The 2010 Oceania Track Championships were the 2010 edition of the annual Oceania Track Championships and were held at the Invercargill ILT Velodrome in Invercargill, New Zealand. Eight of the 10 Olympic events (sprint, team sprint, keirin, and team pursuit) were included for both men and women, however omnium was excluded because at this point it was not in the 2012 Summer Olympics programme. Non-Olympics events (time trial, individual pursuit, points race, scratch race) were also included for both men and women as well as madison for men. Under 19 events were also held for each event, however the men's madison and women's (keirin, team sprint, team pursuit, points race and scratch race were combined Under 19 and Elite events.

Eligible nations

Medal summary

Medal summary U19

Elite medal table

U19 medal table

Overall medal table

Olympic event medal table

Oceania Track Championships
2011 in track cycling